KXZI-LP (101.9 FM, "Montana Radio Cafe") is a radio station licensed to serve Kalispell, Montana.  The station is owned by Scott Johnston and the broadcast license is held by The Cross Works Ministries.  KXZI-LP airs a variety format described as "front porch" music.

History
This station received its original construction permit from the Federal Communications Commission on November 18, 2002.  The new station was assigned the KXZI-LP call sign by the FCC on October 21, 2003.  KXZI-LP received its license to cover from the FCC on April 27, 2005.

References

External links
KXZI-LP official website
 

XZI-LP
Radio stations established in 2004
Flathead County, Montana
XZI-LP